Parineeta is a 1953 Indian Hindi-language drama film starring Meena Kumari and Ashok Kumar , based upon the 1914 Bengali novella of the same name by Sarat Chandra Chattopadhyay. The film was directed by Bimal Roy. This version of the film is considered by many to be the most faithful adaptation of the novella, particularly due to Meena Kumari's interpretation of the role of Lalita.

Story 
Lalita (Meena Kumari) is an orphaned niece of an impoverished clerk named Gurucharan (Nazir Hussain). Shekhar (Ashok Kumar), is the son of their rich landlord neighbor. Shekhar had a liking for Lalita. Gurucharan has to mortgage his house to Shekhar's father in order to get one of his daughters married as he is heavily debt-ridden. Shekhar's father often chides him about his overdue loan and a day comes when completely pressed on all sides, Gurucharan is forced to take advantage of the altruistic offer of an interest-free loan made by a wealthy young man named Girin. This gives rise to an ugly misunderstanding that Lalita has been "sold" to Girin. What happens thereafter forms the gripping conclusion of this great story of perfect love.

Cast 
 Ashok Kumar as Shekhar Rai
 Meena Kumari as Lalita
 Asit Baran as Girin 
 Nazir Hussain as Gurucharan 
 Badri Prasad as Nabin Rai
 Pratima Devi as Shekhar's Aunty
 Manorama as Chachi
 Rekha Mallick
 Manju

Music 
Lyrics: Bharat Vyas

Music : Manna Dey & Arun Mukherjee
 "Gore Gore Haathon Mein Mehndi Racha Ke, Nainon Mein Kajra Daal Ke" – Asha Bhosle , Music: Arun Mukherjee
 "Chali Radhe Rani" – Manna Dey , Music: Manna Dey
 "Chand Hai Wohi, Udaas Mera Mann" – Geeta Dutt , Music: Manna Dey
 "Aye Baandi Tum Begum Bano Khwab Dekha Hai" – Kishore Kumar, Asha Bhosle , Music: Manna Dey
 "Toota Hai Naata Meet Ka Par Meet Mila Hamen Meet Ka" – Asit Baran  Music: Arun Mukherjee
 "Tum Yaad Aa Rahe" – Asha Bhosle , Music: Arun Mukherjee

Awards 
 1954 Filmfare Best Director Award – Bimal Roy
 1954 Filmfare Best Actress Award – Meena Kumari

References

External links 
 Review
 
 Filmy Sasi 

1953 films
Films based on Indian novels
1950s Hindi-language films
Films directed by Bimal Roy
Films set in Kolkata
Films based on works by Sarat Chandra Chattopadhyay
Films about women in India
Indian drama films
1953 drama films
Indian black-and-white films